In chemistry, the term chemically inert is used to describe a substance that is not chemically reactive. From a thermodynamic perspective, a substance is inert, or nonlabile, if it is thermodynamically unstable (positive standard Gibbs free energy of formation) yet decomposes at a slow, or negligible rate.

Most of the noble gases, which appear in the last column of the periodic table, are classified as inert (or unreactive). These elements are stable in their naturally occurring form (gaseous form) and they are called inert gases.

Noble gas

The noble gases (helium, neon, argon, krypton, xenon and radon) were previously known as 'inert gases' because of their perceived lack of participation in any chemical reactions. The reason for this is that their outermost electron shells (valence shells) are completely filled, so that they have little tendency to gain or lose electrons. They are said to acquire a noble gas configuration, or a full electron configuration. 

It is now known that most of these gases in fact do react to form chemical compounds, such as xenon tetrafluoride. Hence, they have been renamed to 'noble gases', as the only two of these we know truly to be inert are helium and neon. However, a large amount of energy is required to drive such reactions, usually in the form of heat, pressure, or radiation, often assisted by catalysts. The resulting compounds often need to be kept in moisture-free conditions at low temperatures to prevent rapid decomposition back into their elements.

Inert gas

The term inert may also be applied in a relative sense. For example, molecular nitrogen is an inert gas under ordinary conditions, existing as diatomic molecules, . The presence of a strong triple covalent bond in the  molecule renders it unreactive under normal circumstances. Nevertheless, nitrogen gas does react with the alkali metal lithium to form compound lithium nitride (Li3N), even under ordinary conditions. Under high pressures and temperatures and with the right catalysts, nitrogen becomes more reactive; the Haber process uses such conditions to produce ammonia from atmospheric nitrogen.

Main uses 
Inert atmospheres consisting of gases such as argon, nitrogen, or helium are commonly used in chemical reaction chambers and in storage containers for oxygen- or water-sensitive substances, to prevent unwanted reactions of these substances with oxygen or water. 

Argon is widely used in fluorescence tubes and low energy light bulbs. Argon gas helps to protect the metal filament inside the bulb from reacting with oxygen and corroding the filament under high temperature. 

Neon is used in making advertising signs. Neon gas in a vacuum tube glows bright red in colour when electricity is passed through. Different coloured neon lights can also be made by using other gases. 

Helium gas is mainly used to fill hot air and party balloons. Balloons filled with it float upwards and this phenomenon is achieved as helium gas is less dense than air.

See also 

 Noble metal

References 

Chemical nomenclature
Chemical properties
Gases
Industrial gases
Noble gases